Triodia nubifer is a species of moth belonging to the family Hepialidae. It was described by Julius Lederer in 1853 and is known from Central Russia and Kazakhstan.

References

External links
Hepialidae genera
"Triodia nubifer (Lederer, 1853) (Lepidoptera, Hepialidae) from the Altai Mountains - a new species for the Russian fauna". Amurian Zoological Journal. 3 (4): 367-369. 
"Is Triodia nubifer (Lepidoptera, Hepialidae) the only pre- or interglacial relic species of Lepidoptera in the Altai-Sayan Mountain System?". Euroasian Entomological Journal. 14 (2): 134-134.

Hepialidae
Moths described in 1853
Moths of Asia
Taxa named by Julius Lederer